The 2017 season is DPMM FC's 6th consecutive season in the top flight of Singapore football and in the S.League. Along with the S.League, the club will also compete in the Singapore Cup and the Singapore League Cup.

Squad

S.League squad

Coaching staff

Transfers

Pre-season transfers
Source

In

Out

Mid-season transfers

In

Out

On Trial

Friendlies

Team statistics

Appearances and goals

Competitions

Overview

S.League

Singapore Cup

Home United won 6-2 on aggregate.

Singapore TNP League Cup

Group stage

Knockout stage

References

DPMM FC seasons
Singaporean football clubs 2017 season